In physics, droplet-shaped waves are casual localized solutions of the wave equation closely related to the X-shaped waves, but, in contrast, possessing a finite support.

A family of the droplet-shaped waves was obtained by extension of the "toy model" of X-wave 
generation by a superluminal point electric charge (tachyon) at infinite rectilinear motion

to the case of a line source pulse started at time . The pulse front is supposed to propagate
with a constant superluminal velocity  (here  is the speed of light,
so ).

In the cylindrical spacetime coordinate system ,
originated in the point of pulse generation and oriented along the (given) line of source propagation (direction z),
the general expression for such a source pulse takes the form

the Dirac delta and Heaviside step functions
while  is an arbitrary continuous function representing the pulse shape.
Notably, 

As far as the wave source does not exist prior to the moment , 
a one-time application of the causality principle implies zero wavefunction 
 for negative values of time.

As a consequence,  is uniquely defined by the problem for the wave equation with
the time-asymmetric homogeneous initial condition

The general integral solution for the resulting waves and the analytical description of their finite,
droplet-shaped support can be obtained from the above problem using the 
STTD technique.

See also 
 X-wave

References

Wave mechanics